The  was the Imperial Japanese Navy's military police, equivalent to the Imperial Japanese Army's Kempeitai. It was also the smallest military police service.

The original Tokkeitai was known as the General Affairs Section and concerned itself with police and personnel work within the Navy: personnel, discipline and records. It took a more active role, partly to keep the Kempeitai and the Army from meddling in Navy affairs.

It was especially active in the areas of the South Pacific and the Naval Control Area and was as pervasive as the Kempeitai. It had the same commissar roles in relation to exterior enemies or suspicious persons, and it watched inside units for possible defectors or traitors under the security doctrine of Kikosaku.

Attached to navy units, they served as Colonial police in some occupied Pacific areas. Later accusations of war crimes were made against them in that role for such acts as coercion of comfort women from Indonesia, Indochina and China into sexual slavery.

In addition to its police responsibilities, it was the operative branch of the Secret Service Branch of the Imperial Japanese Navy (which was responsible for recovering and analyzing information and for the execution of undercover operations. Its members also provided local security near naval bases. In the final weeks of the Pacific War, it was among the security units prepared for combat against the proposed Allied invasion of Japan.

References

Defunct law enforcement agencies of Japan
Defunct Japanese intelligence agencies
Imperial Japanese Navy
Political repression in Japan
Japan
National security institutions